Tony Becker (born September 14, 1963, in Los Angeles, California) is an American actor best known for his role as Private Daniel 'Danny' Purcell on the 1987-1990 CBS Vietnam War series Tour of Duty.

Career
Becker's first television role was on the short-lived ABC network sitcom The Texas Wheelers at age 11, He also co-starred on the series The Oregon Trail and For Love and Honor and had a recurring role as Drew Cutler on The Waltons, a role he later reprised in several reunion movies.

In addition, he also guest starred on numerous television series including Marcus Welby, M.D., Lou Grant, Little House on the Prairie, Knots Landing, Matlock, Walker, Texas Ranger and Melrose Place. He also had a small part in the 1986 action thriller film Iron Eagle

Becker also appeared in the award-winning Herding Cats (commercial) shown at the Super Bowl in 2000.
Becker appeared in another commercial for GEICO Insurance Company as an Oil Field Foreman that debuted on February 22, 2019.

References

External links
 

1963 births
Male actors from Los Angeles
Living people
American male television actors
American male child actors
20th-century American male actors